Snow Lake is a glacial tarn in the Ruby Mountains, in Elko County in the northeastern part of the state of Nevada.

Lakes of Elko County, Nevada
Ruby Mountains
Lakes of Nevada
Lakes of the Great Basin